Labdia ochrotypa is a moth in the family Cosmopterigidae. It was described by John David Bradley in 1961. It is found on Rennell Island and Bellona Island in the Solomon Islands.

References

Labdia
Moths described in 1961